Summertime: Willie Nelson Sings Gershwin is the 64th solo studio album by American singer-songwriter Willie Nelson. After being awarded the Gershwin Prize by the Library of Congress, Nelson recorded a set of pop standards written by George and Ira Gershwin. The recording of the album was produced by Buddy Cannon and Matt Rollings. It includes the duets "Let's Call The Whole Thing Off" with Cyndi Lauper and "Embraceable You" with Sheryl Crow.

To select the songs for the album, Nelson was inspired by the Frank Sinatra recordings of Gershwin songs. Meanwhile, he decided to name the album after the song "Summertime", based on his past election to name a previous hit record Stardust On January 19, Nelson a video of the title-track as a preview to the release. The album was released by Legacy Recordings on February 26, 2016. Summertime: Willie Nelson Sings Gershwin won the Best Traditional Pop Vocal Album award at the 59th Annual Grammy Awards in 2017.

Reception
In its first week, the album sold 13,000 copies. It debuted at number one on the Traditional Jazz and Top Jazz Albums Billboard charts, becoming Nelson's third album to top the latter. Meanwhile, it reached number fourteen in Top Album Sales and reached forty in the Billboard 200. The album has sold 35,000 copies in the United States .

Personnel
As listed in the liner notes.

The Family
Bobbie Nelson – piano
Willie Nelson – acoustic guitar, lead vocals
Mickey Raphael – harmonica

Additional musicians
Jay Bellerose – drums
Sheryl Crow – duet vocals on "Embraceable You"
Paul Franklin – steel guitar
Cyndi Lauper – duet vocals on "Let's Call the Whole Thing Off"
Dean Parks – electric guitar, acoustic guitar
David Piltch – upright bass
Matt Rollings – organ

Track listing

Charts

References

2016 albums
Willie Nelson albums
Albums produced by Buddy Cannon
Grammy Award for Best Traditional Pop Vocal Album
Legacy Recordings albums
George and Ira Gershwin tribute albums